Alban Lucien Pierson (born 27 December 1972) is a French sport shooter.

He participated at the 2018 ISSF World Shooting Championships, winning a medal.

References

External links

Living people
1972 births
French male sport shooters
ISSF pistol shooters